"Building Bridges" is a song written and originally recorded by American country music singer-songwriter Larry Willoughby, co-written with Hank DeVito. Willoughby's version peaked at #55 on the Billboard Hot Country Singles chart in 1984.

Chart performance

Nicolette Larson version

A year later, Nicolette Larson - the ex-wife of Hank DeVito - recorded the song on her album ...Say When. Her version went to #72 on the same chart.

Chart performance

Brooks & Dunn/Sheryl Crow/Vince Gill version

"Building Bridges" was covered by country music duo Brooks & Dunn and released as the third single released from their 2005 album Hillbilly Deluxe. It features Sheryl Crow and Vince Gill on background vocals. The song peaked at number four on the country music charts and was nominated for the Country Music Association Award for Musical Event of the Year.

Critical reception
Deborah Evans Price of Billboard described the single favorably, saying that Dunn's "lead vocal is as compelling as always." She also thought that Gill's and Crow's voices made the song "distinctive".

Music video
The music video takes place in the desert with the band and the duo singing in front of big screens at dusk. The music video was directed by Shaun Silva.

Chart performance

Year-end charts

Other versions
The song was sung by Steve Sanders as a member of The Mighty Oaks Band (the stage band for The Oak Ridge Boys) as a band feature from 1982-1986. The Mighty Oaks Band also recorded the song, but the recording was never commercially released. Their rendition can be heard on various live concert radio broadcasts from that time period.

References

1984 songs
1984 singles
1985 singles
2006 singles
Larry Willoughby songs
Nicolette Larson songs
Brooks & Dunn songs
Sheryl Crow songs
Vince Gill songs
Vocal collaborations
Music videos directed by Shaun Silva
Song recordings produced by Tony Brown (record producer)
Atlantic Records singles
MCA Records singles
Arista Nashville singles
Songs written by Larry Willoughby
Song recordings produced by Emory Gordy Jr.
Songs written by Hank DeVito